Brushy Creek is a stream in southeastern Ste. Genevieve County in the U.S. state of Missouri. It is a tributary of Saline Creek.

Brushy Creek was so named on account of brush along its course.

See also
List of rivers of Missouri

References

Rivers of Ste. Genevieve County, Missouri
Rivers of Missouri